Beatriz Sánchez (born 20 December 1989) is a Spanish basketball player for Durán Maquinaria Ensino and the Spanish national team.

She won gold medal at the EuroBasket Women 2017.

Club career
She started in the youth levels of CB Portuense, moving to Uni-Cajacanarias as a senior in 2007, in the second tier of the Spanish League. In the following years she played at ADBA Avilés, Universitario de Ferrol and CB Bembibre PDM, winning promotion to the first tier in 2012. In 2013 she signed for Universitario de Ferrol. In 2018 she signed for Spar CityLift Girona, and in 2019 for Durán Maquinaria Ensino

National team
She played one youth tournament with the Spanish squad in 2007, and she made her debut with the senior team in 2017, winning gold medal at the 2017 Eurobasket:

  2007 FIBA Europe Under-18 Championship for Women (youth)
  2017 Eurobasket
  2018 World Championship

References

External links
 
 

1996 births
Living people
Spanish women's basketball players
Sportspeople from Cádiz
Power forwards (basketball)